The Scottish Review of Books is a quarterly literary magazine published in Scotland. It was established in October 2004 with the support of the  Scottish Arts Council. In 2009 it became a limited company with a board of directors, Scottish Review of Books Limited. It has published articles by many distinguished contributors and commentators. The Review has been highly successful since its launch and now has a circulation of around 320,000 copies per year.

The magazine is inserted free of charge in  The Herald newspaper and is also available by subscription in print or online and in schools, museums, libraries, book festivals and bookshops across Scotland. The tie-in with The Herald has been of considerable benefit in improving its reach; Carla Sassi of the University of Verona comments that "the Scottish Review of Books... probably reaches a larger reading public than any specialised literary journal or magazine did in the past."

According to the editor, Alan Taylor, "our aim ... is to get people talking about issues surrounding Scottish literature and to challenge people’s perceptions about particular subjects. At a time when Edinburgh has been recognised by UNESCO as the first World City of Literature and when Scotland’s writers are receiving both critical and popular acclaim, a magazine such as this is a timely and much needed addition to the literature landscape in Scotland." It was established to provide a smaller-scale Scottish equivalent of the London Review of Books, on which it is closely modelled in name and appearance. Unlike the LRB, which covers world literature, the SRB deals only with Scottish books.

The impetus for its establishment came from a Review of Scottish Publishing issued by the Scottish Arts Council in 2004. The review, carried out by PricewaterhouseCoopers and Napier University on behalf of the SAC, recommended the creation of a new magazine to promote Scottish books as part of a wider effort to boost Scottish book publishing. The launch of the Scottish Review of Books was underwritten by two publishers, Derek Rodger of Argyll Publishing, and Hugh Andrew of Birlinn and Polygon with the aid of grants from the SAC. Alan Taylor, the Associate and Literary Editor of the Sunday Herald and former Deputy Editor of The Scotsman, was appointed as editor.

The Glasgow design consultancy Freight carried out a major redesign of the Scottish Review of Books in 2010. It also switched to being published in the Saturday edition of The Herald, rather than on Sundays as previously.

References

External links

Quarterly magazines published in the United Kingdom
Literary magazines published in Scotland
2005 establishments in Scotland
Magazine publishing companies of Scotland
Companies based in Argyll and Bute
Magazines established in 2005